Kirsten Tibballs is an Australian pastry chef and chocolatier. Tibballs has represented Australia at world championships and as a judge for global competitions. In 2002 Tibballs founded Savour Chocolate and Patisserie School in Brunswick, Melbourne. Tibballs is the author of two cookbooks, a regular contributor to pastry publications and has featured on several television shows including MasterChef Australia. As one of the most followed female pastry chefs on Instagram, Tibballs is regularly referred to as the ‘Queen of Chocolate’ due to her contribution to the chocolate industry.

Early life
Tibballs was born in Leongatha, Victoria to parents Christine and Allan, and grew up in Pearcedale. Tibballs always had an interest in pastry; baking and entering cake-making and pastry categories in the Dandenong Show at age 12. Tibballs started her apprenticeship at a small patisserie in Mornington. At 20, Tibballs joined the Sheraton Towers Hotel in Melbourne as a commis pastry chef. Two years later, Tibballs won the National Australian Baking Scholarship Award, which saw Tibballs travel to work in Europe with pastry chefs in Brussels and Paris.

Career
Tibballs is an ambassador for both the Bulla Family Dairy and the Belgian chocolate brand Callebaut.

Savour Chocolate and Patisserie School
In 2002, Tibballs founded Savour Chocolate and Patisserie School. Tibballs cited the local Australian market as "lagging" compared to the European market and so wanted to open an institution that offered the resources for Australian pastry chefs who could not afford to travel to Europe. The school teaches a variety of classes on chocolate and patisserie.

Mix n’ Make app
In June 2017, Tibballs released her first app, Mix n’ Make. The idea of the game is to create unique recipes and flavour combinations for éclairs, tarts and macarons. The user can then download a recipe book of their own creations.

Television appearances
Tibballs has appeared on MasterChef Australia numerous times. She appeared in two episodes of Series 5, one episode of Series 7, and two episodes of Series 9 including the season finale where she presented her 'Trio of Fruits' and one episode of series 10.

Tibballs has appeared several times on Everyday Gourmet with Justine Schofield, a Foxtel Lifestyle product hosted by Justine Schofield, a contestant from MasterChef Australia’s first season.

Kirsten has recently completed filming on her third series of her own cooking program, The Chocolate Queen which airs on Foxtel and SBS in Australia.

Awards
1st in the World, 2004 World Pastry Team Championships, Las Vegas, USA
Gold medal, Live Patisserie Competition, 2004 Pastry Olympics, Germany

Personal life
Tibballs is married to her husband Michael and has a son, Charlie.

Bibliography

References

External links

Chocolatiers
Pastry chefs
Australian television chefs
1973 births
Living people
People from Leongatha
Women chefs